Lac qui Parle State Park  is a state park of Minnesota, United States, near Watson. Lac qui Parle is a French translation of the native Dakota name, meaning "talking lake".

The state park was built as part of the Lac qui Parle Flood Control Project.  Lac qui Parle itself is a widening of the Minnesota River, and the flood control project involved building a dam at the south end of the lake.  The dam was constructed by the Works Progress Administration, and other projects were built along the lake.  Besides the dam and the state park, other projects included the Watson Wayside, Lac qui Parle Parkway, and the reconstruction of the Lac qui Parle Mission.  Three structures are included in the National Register of Historic Places, including the Model Shelter, which houses a relief map (cast in reinforced concrete) of the Lac qui Parle Flood Control System and the Minnesota River Valley; the kitchen shelter; and the sanitation building.

References

External links
 Lac qui Parle State Park

1959 establishments in Minnesota
Historic districts on the National Register of Historic Places in Minnesota
Minnesota River
Protected areas established in 1959
Protected areas of Chippewa County, Minnesota
Protected areas of Lac qui Parle County, Minnesota
Rustic architecture in Minnesota
State parks of Minnesota
Works Progress Administration in Minnesota
National Register of Historic Places in Chippewa County, Minnesota